Joel López (born 22 October 1982) is a Paraguayan footballer who plays as a forward. He is currently a free agent.

Career
López had a senior career spell with River Plate, with the club in the 2007 Paraguayan Tercera División. In 2008, Chilean Primera División side Deportes Melipilla signed López. He scored one goal, versus Cobresal on 16 March, in four appearances as the club were relegated to the 2009 Primera B de Chile.

Career statistics
.

References

External links

1982 births
Living people
Place of birth missing (living people)
Paraguayan footballers
Association football forwards
Paraguayan expatriate footballers
Expatriate footballers in Chile
Paraguayan expatriate sportspeople in Chile
Chilean Primera División players
River Plate (Asunción) footballers
Deportes Melipilla footballers